Patrick Roger Vail (March 30, 1859 – January 30, 1913) was an American politician and businessman.

Vail was born in Shullsburg, Lafayette County, Wisconsin. He moved to Ontonagon, Michigan to live with a uncle when his parents died. Vail moved to Ely, Minnesota in 1887 and was a merchant. He served as Mayor of Ely and was a Republican. Vail served in the Minnesota House of Representatives in 1897 and 1898 and in the Minnesota Senate from 1907 to 1910. He died at his home in Virginia, Minnesota.

References

1859 births
1913 deaths
People from Ely, Minnesota
People from Ontonagon, Michigan
People from Shullsburg, Wisconsin
People from Virginia, Minnesota
Businesspeople from Minnesota
Mayors of places in Minnesota
Republican Party members of the Minnesota House of Representatives
Republican Party Minnesota state senators